Pavumba  is a village in the outskirts of Kollam district, Pavumba is a village in Thazhava Panchayat located in the north-east of Karunagapalli taluk. It is bordered by Vallikunnam in the north, Todiyur in the south, Sooranad in the east and Manapally village in the Thazhava panchayat in the west. It is known as the place of weaving "Thazhappaya" in the rural culture of Kerala. It is a border village of Kollam district and Alappuzha in the north starts from here. The name Pavumba is derived from the name "Pampin waa". Its history can still be seen in the Thrippavumba Mahadeva temple.

Demographics
 India census, Pavumba had a population of 16413 with 7772 males and 8641 females.

References

Villages in Kollam district